The 1954 Torneo Godó was the second edition of the Torneo Godó annual tennis tournament played on clay courts in Barcelona, Spain. It took place from May 11–16, 1954.

Seeds

Draw

Final Four

Earlier rounds

Top half

Bottom half

External links
 ITF – Tournament details
 Official tournament website
 ATP tournament profile

Barcelona Open (tennis)
Godo
Spain